The 1993–94 New Jersey Devils season was the 20th season for the National Hockey League franchise that was established on June 11, 1974, and 12th season since the franchise relocated from Colorado prior to the 1982–83 NHL season. For the fourth consecutive season, the Devils qualified for the playoffs. In the playoffs, The Devils made it all the way to the Eastern Conference Final where they came within a game of advancing to the 1994 Stanley Cup Finals. Goaltender Martin Brodeur won the Calder Memorial Trophy as the NHL's top rookie and new coach Jacques Lemaire won the Jack Adams Award as the NHL's top coach.

Regular season
The New Jersey Devils opened the 1993–94 season with 7 consecutive wins. They finished second in scoring and in goaltending. They also set team records in wins (47) and points (106). Captain Scott Stevens led the league in +/- with +53.

During the regular season, the Devils allowed the fewest even-strength goals (141) and had the fewest power-play opportunities (333).

Final standings

Schedule and results

Playoffs

Round 1 (3) New Jersey Devils vs (6) Buffalo Sabres

New Jersey Wins Series 4-3

Round 2 (3) New Jersey Devils vs (4) Boston Bruins

New Jersey Wins Series 4-2

Round 3 (3) New Jersey Devils vs (1) New York Rangers

New Jersey Loses Series 4-3

Player statistics

Regular season
Scoring

Goaltending

Playoffs
Scoring

Goaltending

Note: GP = Games played; G = Goals; A = Assists; Pts = Points; +/- = Plus/minus; PIM = Penalty minutes; PPG=Power-play goals; SHG=Short-handed goals; GWG=Game-winning goals
      MIN=Minutes played; W = Wins; L = Losses; T = Ties; GA = Goals against; GAA = Goals against average; SO = Shutouts; SA=Shots against; SV=Shots saved; SV% = Save percentage;

Awards and records

Awards

Nominations

Transactions

Draft picks
The New Jersey Devils' picks at the 1993 NHL Entry Draft.

See also
1993–94 NHL season

Notes

References

New Jersey Devils seasons
New Jersey Devils
New Jersey Devils
New Jersey Devils
New Jersey Devils
20th century in East Rutherford, New Jersey
Meadowlands Sports Complex